Dawn Mitchell is an American sportscaster who has worked as a sports anchor and reporter for KMSP-TV in Minneapolis since 2004. She Is a four time Emmy winner.
A graduate of Boston College, Mitchell began her career at NESN, where she was an Anchor for SportsDesk as well as an Emmy Award–winning studio host for Boston Bruins games. She also worked as a sports reporter and anchor for WDJT-TV and CLTV. Mitchell also did sideline Vikings reporting for NFL on Fox.

References

National Hockey League broadcasters
National Football League announcers
Television anchors from Boston
Boston College alumni
Sports in Boston
Sportspeople from Chicago
Television anchors from Chicago
Boston Bruins announcers
Living people
Year of birth missing (living people)